Deh-e Sheykhan may refer to:
Deh-e Sheykhan, Kohgiluyeh and Boyer-Ahmad
Deh-e Sheykhan, Lorestan